Abraham Han (born September 29, 1984) is an American professional boxer. He also fought in the World Combat League.

Personal life
Han's siblings are all professional or amateur boxers.

Professional career
On January 22, 2011, Han beat veteran Orphius Waite by TKO in the second round. This bout was held at the Texas Station in North Las Vegas, Nevada.

On April 5, 2014, Han defeated former world title contender Juan Carlos Candelo via second-round TKO. By defeating Candelo, he was awarded the Universal Boxing Federation Inter-Continental middleweight title.

On September 8, 2017, Han fought J'Leon Love to a technical majority draw. The fight was stopped in the eight round after a clash of heads left Han unable to continue.

References

External links
 

Boxers from Texas
Light-middleweight boxers
1984 births
Living people
People from El Paso, Texas
American male boxers